Harpalus angulatus is a species of ground beetle in the subfamily Harpalinae. It was described by Jules Putzeys in 1878.

References

angulatus
Beetles described in 1878